Kentrothamnus is a monotypic genus of flowering plants in the family Rhamnaceae, native to Bolivia and Argentina. The only species is Kentrothamnus weddellianus. It is an actinorhizal plant.

References

Rhamnaceae genera
Rhamnaceae
Monotypic Rosales genera